Shane Leslie Stone  (born 25 September 1950) is an Australian political figure. He is currently the Chair of the Council for the Order of Australia. He was also the Coordinator-General of the National Recovery and Resilience Agency and its predecessors until August 2022. He was previously the Chief Minister of the Northern Territory between May 1995 and February 1999, representing the Country Liberal Party. He was also the President of the Liberal Party of Australia between July 1999 and 2005.

Political career

1990s 

First elected to the Northern Territory Legislative Assembly Electoral division of Port Darwin as a member of the Country Liberal Party (CLP) in 1990, Stone held several portfolios, including Attorney-General, Education and the Arts, Employment and Training, Mines and Energy, Industries and Development, and Asian Relations and Trade. In late 1997 Stone attracted sustained criticism when as the First Law Officer being the Attorney-General he appointed himself a Queen's Counsel.

Stone was the Chief Minister during the referendum for statehood for the Northern Territory in 1998. Electors were asked to vote on whether the Northern Territory should become a state with a constitution that had been approved by a Constitutional Assembly. A bipartisan committee of the Northern Territory Legislative Assembly had recommended a constitution and that it should be further considered by an elected Constitutional Assembly. The CLP Government put forward a different constitution to a non-elected Constitutional Assembly. The referendum failed narrowly. The following year Stone resigned as Chief Minister; 18 months later the CLP under Denis Burke lost the next Territory election after 27 years in power. In 1999 he became the federal President of the Liberal Party of Australia, and was appointed a Commander of the Order of Kinabalu by the Malaysian state of Sabah.

2000s 
In 2001 he wrote a memo, later leaked to the press, that suggested that the government of John Howard was seen as "mean and tricky". The ensuing controversy quickly mushroomed, with Stone and Howard both being accused of leaking the memo.

Stone is the Executive Chairman of the APAC Group of Companies. He was the National Chairman of the Duke of Edinburgh's International Award - Australia from 2012 to 2018. He is currently an Award Ambassador. Awarded the Centenary Medal in 2001, Stone was appointed a Companion of the Order of Australia in the 2006 Queen's Birthday Honours for his service to politics, industry, and bi-lateral relations between Australia and the Asia-Pacific region. In 2018, Stone was appointed chair of the Council for the Order of Australia. In 2019 he was presented with the Gold Distinguished Service Medal, The Duke of Edinburgh's International Award – Australia, this being the highest level of recognition made by the Award in Australia. The award was made by Prince Edward, Earl of Wessex.

2020s
In March 2019, he was appointed by Prime Minister Scott Morrison as head of the North Queensland Livestock Industry Recovery Agency following the North Queensland floods. In December 2019, North Queensland Livestock Industry Recovery Agency was expanded to include drought and renamed into a new National Drought and North Queensland Flood Response and Recovery Agency, with Stone appointed the Coordinator-General of the new agency. The agency was further subsumed into the National Recovery and Resilience Agency (NRRA) on 5 May 2021 and Stone continued to be the Coordinator-General of the new agency. During the Queensland and New South Wales floods in March 2022, Stone suggested inundated homes in flood-prone areas should not be rebuilt, and residents of flood-prone areas needed to "face realities". He was criticised by the opposition Labor Party for being "insensitive to those who had lost properties and livelihoods" and should be sacked for "victim blaming".

Following Labor's victory at the May 2022 federal election, in July 2022, the new Albanese government announced the merger of the NRRA and the Emergency Management Australia on 1 September 2022 to form the National Emergency Management, Resilience and Recovery Agency (NEMRRA). Following the announcement, Stone took leave and left the NRRA on 31 August.

References

Country Liberal Party members of the Northern Territory Legislative Assembly
1950 births
Living people
Companions of the Order of Australia
Members of the Northern Territory Legislative Assembly
Delegates to the Australian Constitutional Convention 1998
20th-century Australian politicians
Attorneys-General of the Northern Territory
Australian King's Counsel
Melbourne Law School alumni
Chief Ministers of the Northern Territory